Charles Barton Kendall, Jr (born January 4, 1935) is a former American football defensive back who played one season with the Houston Oilers of the American Football League. He first enrolled at Los Angeles Valley College before transferring to the University of California, Los Angeles. He attended Verdugo Hills High School in Los Angeles, California. In 1982, Kendall was reportedly interested in purchasing the Los Angeles Clippers from owner Donald Sterling but Sterling did not sell.

References

External links
Just Sports Stats

Living people
1935 births
Players of American football from Los Angeles
American football defensive backs
Los Angeles Valley Monarchs football players
UCLA Bruins football players
Houston Oilers players
Sportspeople from Manila
American Football League players